Bulrush Lake may refer to:

in Canada
Bulrush Lake (Saskatchewan), in Saskatchewan

in New Zealand
Bulrush Lake (Northland)